The Ruhr Red Army (13 March – 12 April 1920) was an army of between 50,000 and 80,000 left-wing workers who conducted what was known as the Ruhr Uprising (Ruhraufstand), in the Weimar Republic. It was the largest armed workers' uprising in the nation's history, and ran from 13 March to 2 April, 1920, in Germany's most important industrial area.  The workers were reacting to the Kapp Putsch, an effort by right-wing forces in March 1920 to overthrow the elected government. 

After calling a general strike on 14 March, the Red Ruhr Army defeated the Freikorps and regular army units in the area and started the uprising. The government sent in regular and paramilitary forces, killing an estimated 1,000 workers and suppressing the revolt.

Description
The workers were drawn from the Communist Party of Germany, the Communist Workers' Party of Germany, the Independent Social Democratic Party of Germany, and the Free Workers Union of Germany. Their army formed in the Ruhr Valley (the most important industrial area of Germany) on 13 March 1920 as a reaction to the Kapp Putsch. While the middle and upper classes feared a left-wing putsch, 300,000 mine workers supported the Ruhr Red Army. The strikers took over Düsseldorf, Elberfeld, and Essen, and soon had control over the whole Ruhr area.

  
After the failure of negotiations with the strikers, the government sent more troops into the Ruhr area on 2 April 1920. It was virtually civil war. These government troops consisted largely of regulars, but also of Freikorps paramilitary soldiers, who finally defeated the workers' uprising and reconquered the Ruhr area. While the Freikorps lost only 250 men, the Red Ruhr Army lost over a thousand during the bitter fighting. A memorial to the uprising was installed in Hagen.

On 12 April Reichswehr General Oskar von Watter banned any illegal behaviour on the part of his troops. He ended all battles and fights in the Ruhr area.

See also
 Hans Marchwitza
 Wilhelm Zaisser
 Karl Schröder

References

1920s coups d'état and coup attempts
Attempted coups in Germany
Left-wing militant groups in Germany
Paramilitary organisations of the Weimar Republic
1920 in Germany
Conflicts in 1920
Ruhr
20th century in North Rhine-Westphalia
Rhine Province
Province of Westphalia